Robert Lloyd George Armstrong (22 May 1914 – 9 April 1959) was an Irish cricketer. He was a right-handed batsman and a right-arm medium pace bowler.

Armstrong made his debut for Ireland in August 1947, playing against the MCC at Lord's. He went on to play for them on 11 occasions, his last match coming against Glamorgan in May 1953. Five of his games for Ireland had first-class status.

Armstrong's daughter, Donna Armstrong, played international cricket for the Irish women's team.

References
CricketEurope Stats Zone profile

1914 births
1959 deaths
Irish cricketers
People from County Armagh
Cricketers from Northern Ireland